The 2nd National Congress of the Lao People's Revolutionary Party (LPRP) was held in Vientiane on 3–6 February 1972. The congress occurs once every five years. A total of 125 delegates represented the party's nearly 21,000 card-carrying members.

The 2nd National Congress renamed the party; from Lao People's Party to the Lao People's Revolutionary Party.

References

Congresses of the Lao People's Revolutionary Party
1972 in Laos
1972 conferences